Giovanni Taormina (born 8 May 1988 in Agrigento) is an Italian professional football player currently playing for F.C. Esperia Viareggio.

In 2009, he was transferred to Viareggio in co-ownership deal. In January 2010 he was loaned to Carrarese as part of Roberto Falivena's deal. In June 2010, Sampdoria gave up the remain 50% registration rights to Viareggio. He made a breakthrough in 2010–11 season, played 31 league matches plus twice in relegation playoffs. He also played 2 out of 6 games in 2010–11 Coppa Italia Lega Pro.

References

External links
 

1988 births
Living people
Italian footballers
U.C. Sampdoria players
U.S. Alessandria Calcio 1912 players
A.S.D. Sorrento players
Como 1907 players
F.C. Esperia Viareggio players
Carrarese Calcio players
Association football midfielders
People from Agrigento
Footballers from Sicily
Sportspeople from the Province of Agrigento